The French Lieutenant's Woman is a 1981 British romantic drama film directed by Karel Reisz, produced by Leon Clore, and adapted by the playwright Harold Pinter. It is based on The French Lieutenant's Woman, a 1969 novel by John Fowles. The music score is by Carl Davis and the cinematography by Freddie Francis.

The film stars Meryl Streep and Jeremy Irons. Other featured actors include Hilton McRae, Peter Vaughan, Colin Jeavons, Liz Smith, Patience Collier, Richard Griffiths, David Warner, Alun Armstrong, Penelope Wilton, and Leo McKern.

The film received five Oscar nominations. Streep was nominated for the Academy Award for Best Actress, and Pinter for the Academy Award for Best Adapted Screenplay.

Plot
The film intercuts the stories of two romantic affairs. One is within a Victorian period drama involving a gentleman palaeontologist, Charles Smithson, and the complex and troubled Sarah Woodruff, known as "the French lieutenant's woman". The other affair is between the actors Mike and Anna, playing the lead roles in a modern filming of the story. In both segments, Jeremy Irons and Meryl Streep play the lead roles.

John Fowles's The French Lieutenant's Woman had multiple endings, and the two parallel stories in the movie have different outcomes. In the Victorian story, Charles enters into an intensely emotional relationship with Sarah, an enigmatic and self-imposed exile he meets just after becoming engaged to Ernestina (Lynsey Baxter), a rich merchant's daughter in Lyme Regis. Charles and Sarah meet secretly in the Lyme Regis Undercliff and eventually have sex in an Exeter hotel.

This leads to Charles's breaking his engagement, but then Sarah disappears. In social disgrace after being sued for breach of promise by Ernestina, Charles searches for Sarah, fearing she has become a prostitute in London. After three years, Sarah, who has a job as a governess in the Lake District, contacts Charles to explain that she needed time to find herself. Despite Charles's initial anger, he forgives her, and the two are reconciled. They are finally seen boating on Windermere.

In the modern story, the American actress Anna and the English actor Mike, both married, are shown as having an extended affair during the making of the Victorian film, in which Anna plays Sarah and Mike portrays Charles. As filming concludes, Mike wishes to continue the relationship, but Anna becomes increasingly cool about the affair and avoids Mike in favour of spending time with her French husband. During the film's wrap party, Anna leaves without saying goodbye to Mike. Mike calls to Anna, using her character's name Sarah, from an upstairs window on the set where Charles and Sarah reconciled, as she drives away.

Cast

 Meryl Streep as Miss Sarah Woodruff / Mrs. Roughwood and Anna
 Jeremy Irons as Charles Henry Smithson and Mike 
 Hilton McRae as Sam 
 Emily Morgan as Mary 
 Charlotte Mitchell as Mrs. Tranter
 Lynsey Baxter as Miss Ernestina Freeman
 Jean Faulds as Cook
 Peter Vaughan as Mr. Ernest Freeman
 Colin Jeavons as Vicar
 Liz Smith as Mrs. Fairley
 Patience Collier as Mrs. Poulteney
 John Barrett as Dairyman
 Leo McKern as Dr. Grogan
 Penelope Wilton as Sonia
 Alun Armstrong as Grimes
 Gérard Falconetti as Davide

Production notes
Harold Pinter and Karel Reisz worked on the script in 1979, with Leon Clore as producer, and with whom Reisz regularly worked in their company Film Contracts, formed many years earlier. Leon had produced Reisz' Morgan: A Suitable Case for Treatment. The film was shot in 1980 on location in Lyme Regis, Dartmouth, Exeter, London docks, and Lake Windermere. Studio sets were built at Twickenham Studios in London to Assheton Gorton's period-perfect designs. The opening shot in the film establishes the dual stories by having the assistant director mark the shot with a clapper board, and then run out of the shot to reveal the Victorian seaside front, with Charles and Ernestina taking the air.

The audience is given alternating sequences of a rigid Victorian society, and the more relaxed modern life of a working film crew, revealing the great moral divide between past and present. Prostitution, Considered in Its Moral, Social, and Sanitary Aspects, an 1857 book by William Acton, is referred to in the film when Streep's character mentions that in 1857 there were 80,000 prostitutes in the county of London and that one house in 60 functioned as a brothel.

The book was published in 1969. Its transfer to the big screen was a protracted process, with film rights changing hands a number of times before a treatment, funds and cast were finalized. Originally, Malcolm Bradbury and Christopher Bigsby approached Fowles to suggest a television adaptation, to which Fowles was amenable, but the producer Saul Zaentz finally arranged for the film version to be made.

A number of directors were attached to the film: Sidney Lumet, Robert Bolt, Fred Zinnemann and Miloš Forman. The script went through a number of treatments, including one by Dennis Potter in 1975 and by James Costigan in 1976, before Pinter's final draft.

Actors considered for the role of Charles Smithson/Mike included Robert Redford and Richard Chamberlain, and Sarah/Anna included Francesca Annis, Charlotte Rampling, Gemma Jones and Fowles's choice Helen Mirren.

The award-winning music was composed by Carl Davis and performed by an unidentified orchestra and viola soloist Kenneth Essex.

Reception
Roger Ebert of the Chicago Sun-Times gave the film three-and-a-half stars out of four, calling it "a beautiful film to look at, and remarkably well-acted". Vincent Canby of The New York Times called it "an astonishingly beautiful film, acted to the elegant hilt by Meryl Streep as the ultimately unreliable Sarah; Jeremy Irons, who looks a lot like the young Laurence Olivier of Wuthering Heights, as Charles Smithson, and by a cast of splendid supporting actors of the sort that only England seems to possess." Variety wrote, "The effect of the two interwoven stories is at time irritating and confusing, but ultimately most affecting. This is due in large part to the strong performances of Meryl Streep as Sara Woodruff/Anna and Jeremy Irons as Charles Smithson/Mike."

Gene Siskel of the Chicago Tribune gave the film four stars out of four and called it "a beautifully made film, evoking the past and the present quite well. Both Streep and Irons live up to the extraordinary advance billing they have received." He ranked the film #10 on his year-end list of the best films of 1981. Sheila Benson of the Los Angeles Times, "The physical trappings that surround the Charles-Sarah story are as detailed and knowledgeable as the book's, yet the film avoids a cozy-corner Victoriana that would have been easy to fall into." She also praised "Meryl Streep's luminous performance" and Assheton Gorton's production design as "nothing short of brilliant".

A mixed review by Pauline Kael of The New Yorker described the novel as "a meditation on the romantic mystery women and sensual madwomen of Victorian fiction", explaining that "We never really get into the movie, because, as Sarah, Meryl Streep gives an immaculate, technically accomplished performance, but she isn't mysterious." Gary Arnold of The Washington Post wrote, "An unfailing pictorial treat, The French Lieutenant's Woman rivals last year's Tess as a handsome and evocative period production."

As of January 2022, The French Lieutenant's Woman held a rating of 82% on Rotten Tomatoes based on 28 reviews. It received a 64 on Metacritic, based on ten reviews.

The film was the second highest-grossing British film for the year with theatrical rentals of £1,244,152, behind Chariots of Fire.

The film was featured in the Season 2 premiere of FX's The Americans.

Awards and nominations

Academy Awards
Nominations
 Best Actress in a Leading Role: Meryl Streep
 Best Writing, Screenplay Based on Material from Another Medium: Harold Pinter
 Best Art Direction-Set Decoration: Assheton Gorton, Ann Mollo
 Best Costume Design: Tom Rand
 Best Film Editing: John Bloom

BAFTA Awards
Wins
 Anthony Asquith Award for Film Music: Carl Davis
 Best Actress: Meryl Streep
 Best Sound: Don Sharp, Ivan Sharrock, Bill Rowe

Nominations
 Best Film: Leon Clore
 Best Actor: Jeremy Irons
 Best Cinematography: Freddie Francis
 Best Costume Design: Tom Rand
 Best Direction: Karel Reisz
 Best Editing: John Bloom
 Best Production Design/Art Direction: Assheton Gorton
 Best Screenplay: Harold Pinter

Golden Globe Awards
Win
Best Actress: Meryl Streep

Nominations
 Best Motion Picture – Drama: Leon Clore
 Best Screenplay: Harold Pinter

Other awards
 Evening Standard British Film Award Best Film: Karel Reisz
 David di Donatello Awards: Best Screenplay for Foreign Film: Harold Pinter
 Los Angeles Film Critics Association Awards: Best Actress: Meryl Streep

References

Bibliography

Further reading

External links
 John Fowles–The Web Site
 
 
The French Lieutenant’s Woman: A Room of Her Own an essay by Lucy Bolton at the Criterion Collection

1981 films
1981 romantic drama films
1980s British films
1980s English-language films
British romantic drama films
Films about filmmaking
Films based on British novels
Films based on romance novels
Films based on works by John Fowles
Films directed by Karel Reisz
Films featuring a Best Drama Actress Golden Globe-winning performance
Films scored by Carl Davis
Films with screenplays by Harold Pinter
Films set in Dorset
Films set in England
United Artists films